Gary Siddall (May 1957), also known by the
nickname of "Big Sid", is an English former professional rugby league footballer who played in the 1970s and 1980s.

Playing career
Siddall made his début for Featherstone Rovers against Widnes on Sunday 10 September 1978, during his time at Featherstone Rovers he scored eleven 3-point tries, and fifteen 4-point tries.

Challenge Cup Final appearances
Siddall played as an interchange/substitute, i.e. number 15, (replacing right- Tim Slatter) in Featherstone Rovers' 14-12 victory over Hull F.C. in the 1983 Challenge Cup Final during the 1982–83 season at Wembley Stadium, London on Saturday 7 May 1983, in front of a crowd of 84,969.

Testimonial match
Siddall's benefit season at Featherstone Rovers took place during the 1989–90 season.

References

External links
Statistics at rugbyleagueproject.org
Gary Siddall
April 2013
Jimmy Bell, Roy Bell, Peter Bell …
The Story of Wembley 1983. Part I - a featherstone rovers blog
The Story of Wembley 1983. Part II - a featherstone rovers blog
The Story of Wembley 1983. Part III - a featherstone rovers blog
The Story of Wembley 1983. Part IV - a featherstone rovers blog
The Story of Wembley 1983. Part V - a featherstone rovers blog
The Story of Wembley 1983. Part VI - a featherstone rovers blog
The Story of Wembley 1983. Part VII - a featherstone rovers blog
The Story of Wembley 1983. Part VIII - a featherstone rovers blog
The Story of Wembley 1983. Part IX - a featherstone rovers blog
The Story of Wembley 1983. Part X - a featherstone rovers blog

1957 births
Living people
English rugby league players
Featherstone Rovers players
Rugby league players from Featherstone
Rugby league props
Rugby league second-rows